Herman J. F. Bilgrien (March 19, 1864 - February 1, 1946) was a member of the Wisconsin State Senate.

Biography
Bilgrien was born on March 19, 1864, in Dodge County, Wisconsin. He would become involved in agriculture. He died on February 1, 1946.

Political career
Bilgrien was a member of the Senate from 1919 to 1926. Additionally, he was Chairman and Treasurer of Iron Ridge, Wisconsin. He was a Republican.

References

External links
 The Political Graveyard

People from Iron Ridge, Wisconsin
Republican Party Wisconsin state senators
1864 births
Farmers from Wisconsin
1946 deaths